Gratangen is a municipality in Troms og Finnmark county, Norway. It is part of the traditional region of Central Hålogaland. The administrative centre of the municipality is the village of Årstein.

The  municipality is the 261st largest by area out of the 356 municipalities in Norway. Gratangen is the 327th most populous municipality in Norway with a population of 1,070.

Other villages in Gratangen include Elvenes, Fjordbotn, and Hilleshamn. The European route E6 highway runs through the southeastern part of the municipality.

General information
The municipality of Gratangen was established on 1 July 1926 when it was separated from the large municipality of Ibestad. The initial population of Gratangen was 1,967. The municipal boundaries have not changed since that time.

On 1 January 2020, the municipality became part of the newly formed Troms og Finnmark county. Previously, it had been part of the old Troms county.

Name
The municipality (originally the parish) is named after the Gratangen fjord.

Coat of arms
The coat of arms was granted on 15 June 1990. The official blazon is "Azure, a chevron embowed argent". This means the arms have a blue field (background) and the charge is a curved chevron. The chevron has a tincture of argent which means it is commonly colored white, but if it is made out of metal, then silver is used. The blue color in the field symbolizes the blue sky (on top) and the Gratangen fjord and sea (on the bottom). The chevron was chosen to represent the snowy mountain peaks. The arms were designed by Even Jarl Skoglund.

Churches
The Church of Norway has one parish within the municipality of Gratangen. It is part of the Trondenes prosti (deanery) in the Diocese of Nord-Hålogaland.

History

Gratangen was the site of the Battle of Gratangen, one of the first battles between the German 3rd Mountain Division under Eduard Dietl and the Norwegian 6th Division under General Carl Gustav Fleischer after the German invasion of Norway on 9 April 1940.

Geography
The municipality encompasses the land on both sides of the Gratangen and southeast of the Astafjorden. The municipality borders Skånland to the west, Ibestad (across the Astafjorden) to the north, Lavangen to the east, and Narvik (in Nordland county) to the south.

Most of the livable land is a narrow area along both sides of the fjord, several side valleys that branch away from the fjord, plus the Fjordbotn area at the head of the fjord.

Climate

Government
All municipalities in Norway, including Gratangen, are responsible for primary education (through 10th grade), outpatient health services, senior citizen services, unemployment and other social services, zoning, economic development, and municipal roads. The municipality is governed by a municipal council of elected representatives, which in turn elect a mayor.  The municipality falls under the Trondenes District Court and the Hålogaland Court of Appeal.

Municipal council
The municipal council  of Gratangen is made up of 15 representatives that are elected to four year terms. The party breakdown of the council is as follows:

Mayors
The mayors of Gratangen:

1926–1929: Mikal Jakobsen 
1929–1931: O.M. Eilivsen-Thraning
1932–1934: Mikal Jakobsen 
1935–1937: Arthur Heggelund (Ap)
1938–1941: Mikal Nilsen  	
1941–1942: Arthur Heggelund (Ap)
1942-1942: Ove Seines 
1942-1942: O.M. Eilivsen-Thraning 
1942–1945: Christian Selnes 
1946–1947: Arthur Heggelund (Ap)
1948–1951: Øyvind Bahr 
1952–1961: Anker Nikolaisen (Ap)
1962–1967: Alfred Pedersen (Ap)
1968–1971: Heiberg Karlsen (LL)
1972–1975: Odd Thraning (Ap)
1976–1979: Arvid Fjellheim (Ap)
1980–1983: Reidar Schjelderup (Sp)
1984–1985: Odd Thraning (Ap)
1986–1989: Arvid Fjellheim (Ap)
1990–1991: Roy-Idar Sandberg (Sp)
1992–1993: Håkon Kristiansen (Ap)
1994–1999: Roy-Idar Sandberg (Sp)
1999–2003: Rita H. Roaldsen (Sp)
2003-2003: Håkon Kristiansen (Ap)
2003–2011: Eva Ottesen (Ap)
2011–2015: Ronny Grindstein (Sp)
2015-2019: Eva Ottesen (Ap)
2019–present: Anita Karlsen (Sp)

References

External links

Municipal fact sheet from Statistics Norway 

 
Municipalities of Troms og Finnmark
Populated places of Arctic Norway
1926 establishments in Norway